Boubacar Keita (born May 20, 1984 in Conakry) is a Guinean footballer currently plays for Kenkre FC in the I-League 2nd Division.

References

External links

1984 births
Association football defenders
Expatriate footballers in Indonesia
Liga 1 (Indonesia) players
Living people
Sportspeople from Conakry
Persitara Jakarta Utara players
Pelita Jaya FC players
Sri Pahang FC players
Arema F.C. players
Sporting Clube de Goa players
Expatriate footballers in Singapore
Guinean footballers
Guinean expatriate footballers
Guinea international footballers
Expatriate footballers in Malaysia
Expatriate footballers in India